Navicula is a genus of boat-shaped diatom algae, comprising over 1,200 species. Navicula is Latin for "small ship", and also a term in English for a boat-shaped incense-holder.

Diatoms — eukaryotic, primarily aquatic, single-celled photosynthetic organisms — play an important role in global ecology, producing about a quarter of all the oxygen within Earth's biosphere, often serving as foundational organisms, or keystone species in the food chain of many environments where they provide a staple for the diets of many aquatic species.

Mobility
Navicula diatoms have been observed to possess a motile ability to glide over one another and on hard surfaces such as microscope slides. Around the outside of the navicula's shell is a girdle of mucilage strands that can flow and thus act as a tank track.

References

External links
 Navicula Image (Missouri State University)
 Navicula sp. Diatoms from Guaíba island, Rio de Janeiro.
 Bacillariophyceae - Navicula Ohio University
 

 
Diatom genera